Patrick Gullane, CM, OOnt, MB, FRCSC, FACS, FRACS (Hon), FRCS (Hon), FRCSI (Hon) is a Professor in the  Department of Otolaryngology-Head and Neck Surgery, and a Professor of Surgery, Faculty of Medicine at the University of Toronto.

Early life
Dr. Patrick Gullane was born in Ireland and received his medical degree from National University of Ireland, Galway, in 1970. He is a Fellow of the Royal College of Surgeons of Canada and certified by the American Board of Otolaryngology–Head and Neck Surgery. In 1975, he was selected as the McLaughlin Fellow and then pursued advanced Fellowship training in Head and Neck Oncology in Pittsburgh and New York.

In 1978, Dr. Gullane was appointed to the Department of Otolaryngology–Head and Neck Surgery at the University of Western Ontario in London, Ontario. He was subsequently recruited to the Department of Otolaryngology–Head and Neck Surgery at the University of Toronto in 1983. In 1989, he was appointed Otolaryngologist-in-Chief at University Health Network, and in 2002, was appointed Professor and Chair of the Department of Otolaryngology–Head and Neck Surgery, University of Toronto. He concluded his second term as Chair in June 2012.

Academic Highlights
Dr. Gullane is a national and international leader in Head and Neck Surgery and has been invited as a visiting professor to over 83 countries, lecturing on all aspects of Head and Neck Oncology. He has delivered over 830 invited and keynote presentations, including the Eugene Myers International lecture at the American Academy of Otolaryngology – Head and Neck Surgery (AAO-HNS) annual meeting September 2006, received the 2007 Medtronic Alumni Award from the National University Ireland (Galway) for contributions to Health Care and Medical Science, the Sir Peter Freyer Memorial lecture to the Irish surgical Forum NUI-Galway in 2009, the John J. Conley lecture to the American Head & Neck Society in 2012, the 87th Abraham Colles lecture at the Royal College of Surgeons in Ireland in February 2012 and the Hayes Martin lecture at the 5th World Congress of IFHNOS and annual meeting of the American Head & Neck Society in New York in July 2014. He was one of six International Faculty leaders who conducted the IFHNOS Head and Neck World Tour Program in 2008.

Dr. Gullane has published 337 papers in peer reviewed journals and 92 chapters in textbooks. In addition, he has published 10 books on various aspects of Head and Neck Surgery. His textbook, ‘Head & Neck Surgery and Oncology,’ was awarded the George Davey Howells Prize from the University of London, cited as the best published book in Otolaryngology–Head and Neck Surgery in the preceding five years. Currently, Dr. Gullane is a member on the Editorial Board of ten journals.

He has served as president of the American Head & Neck Society, The North American Skull Base Society, president of the Canadian Society of Otolaryngology–Head and Neck Surgery and vice-president of the Triological Society.

In recognition of his distinguished achievements, Dr.  Gullane was awarded an Honorary Fellowship of the Royal Australasian College of Surgeons in 2006, Honorary Fellowship of the Royal College of Surgeons of England in 2010 and an Honorary Fellowship in the Royal College of Surgeons of Ireland in 2012. He was elected to Fellowship in the Canadian Academy of Health Sciences in 2011 and in 2010, was appointed as a Member to the Order of Canada by the Governor General of Canada, cited for his inspiration of young surgeons and his contributions to the field of Head and Neck Surgery. In 2014, in recognition of his outstanding contributions, an endowed Chair was named in his honour at the University Health Network/University of Toronto. In Feb 2015, Dr. Gullane was appointed as a Member to the Order of Ontario by the Lieutenant Governor of Ontario for his achievements in the field of Head and Neck Surgery. Finally, he has facilitated the establishment of four University-Hospital Chairs: Head & Neck Surgery, Reconstruction, Radiation Oncology, and Basic Science, from private funding donations in excess of $14.5 million with continued funding to the present time. Dr. Gullane currently holds the Wharton Chair in Head and Neck Surgery at University Health Network and University of Toronto.

Honours and Awards

References

External links

20th-century births
Living people
Academic staff of the University of Toronto
People from County Galway
People from Ballinasloe
Irish emigrants to Canada
Fellows of the American College of Surgeons
Fellows of the Royal College of Surgeons
Fellows of the Royal College of Surgeons in Ireland
Fellows of the Royal Australasian College of Surgeons
Members of the Order of Canada
Members of the Order of Ontario
Year of birth missing (living people)